The 2019 Primera B de Chile (known as Campeonato As.com 2019 for sponsoring purposes) was the 66th season of Chile's second-tier football league. The competition began on 15 February 2019 and was scheduled to end in December 2019.

Due to the 2019 Chilean protests, the competition was suspended since mid-October with three matches as well as the promotion play-offs still left. After a failed attempt to resume normal activity, on 29 November 2019, ANFP's Council of Presidents voted to conclude the season. Originally it was decided that no teams would be either promoted or relegated this season, however, on 6 December 2019 ANFP decided to declare Santiago Wanderers, who were leading the competition at the time of the suspension, as champions and promoted to the Primera División, as well as allowing another team to be promoted through a play-off. No teams were relegated to the Segunda División Profesional this season.

Format

The tournament was played by 16 teams, under the same format used in the previous edition: the 16 teams would play each other twice (once at home and once away), for a total of 30 matches. The team that finished in first place at the end of the round-robin tournament earned promotion to the Campeonato Nacional for the 2020 season as Primera B champions. Meanwhile, the teams finishing from second to tenth place will play a playoff tournament for the second promotion berth, with the season runners-up having a bye to the final. The team finishing in bottom place at the end of the season would have been relegated to the Segunda División Profesional.

Teams

Stadia and locations

Standings

Results

Promotion play-off
The promotion play-offs were played by the nine teams placed from second to tenth place in the league table at the end of the season. Deportes La Serena, as league runners-up, received a bye to the promotion final, while the remaining eight teams played a play-off for the second berth to the promotion final. For the quarter-finals, teams were paired according to their final placement in the Primera B standings, with the third-placed team facing the tenth-placed team, the fourth-placed team facing the ninth-placed one and so on. The winners advanced to the semi-finals, with the higher-seeded team advancing in case of a draw. For the semi-finals, teams were reseeded according to their average of points per match in the league season, with the teams with the higher average playing the teams with lower average. The winners advanced to the finals, with the winners of that match facing Deportes La Serena for the second promotion berth. For the semi-finals, final, and promotion final, a penalty shoot-out would decide the winners in case of a draw. All matches of the promotion play-off were played at a neutral venue, in this case Estadio Nacional Julio Martínez Prádanos in Santiago.

Quarter-finals

Semi-finals

Final

Promotion final

Top goalscorers
{| class="wikitable" border="1"
|-
! Rank
! Name
! Club
! Goals
|-
| align=center | 1
| Mathías Pinto
|Ñublense
| align=center | 14
|-
| align=center | 2
| Maximiliano Quinteros
|Deportes Copiapó
| align=center | 13
|-
| rowspan=2 align=center | 3
| Ignacio Lemmo
|Deportes Puerto Montt
| rowspan=2 align=center | 12
|-
| Gonzalo Sosa
|Deportes Melipilla
|-
| rowspan=3 align=center | 5
| Nicolás Gauna
|Deportes Puerto Montt
| rowspan=3 align=center | 11
|-
| Ignacio Jara
|Cobreloa
|-
| Sebastián Pol
|Deportes Valdivia
|-
| rowspan=2 align=center | 8
| Gustavo Gotti
|Deportes Santa Cruz
| rowspan=2 align=center | 8
|-
| Gustavo Lanaro
|Santiago Wanderers
|-
| rowspan=3 align=center | 10
| Diego Bielkiewicz
|Rangers
| rowspan=3 align=center | 7
|-
| Enzo Gutiérrez
|Santiago Wanderers
|-
| Luca Pontigo
|Deportes Santa Cruz
|}

Source: Soccerway

See also
 2019 Chilean Primera División

References

External links
Primera B on ANFP's website

Primera B de Chile seasons
Primera B
Chile